Karolis Chvedukas (born 21 April 1991) is a Lithuanian footballer playing for KPV Kokkola and the Lithuanian national team as a midfielder.

Club career
Chvedukas moved to Polish I liga side Chojniczanka Chojnice in February 2017.

Midfielder returned to Sūduva on 12 July 2017 after one-year spell abroad.

Chvedukas signed for League of Ireland side Dundalk on 8 January 2018. Chvedukas scored his first goal for Dundalk in an 8-0 demolition of Limerick on 1 March 2018.

On 8 February 2019 Dundalk announced Chvedukas left the club by mutual consent. Shortly later Waterford announced his signing on their official website.

On 28 August 2020 Chvedukas signed for Oratory Youths F.C. playing in the 1st Division League of the Gozo Football Association on the island of Gozo, Malta.

International career
Chvedukas made his first international appearance in a friendly in and against Armenia on 5 March 2014, playing 72 minutes from the start.

Honours
Sūduva Marijampolė
Lithuanian Cup (1): 2009
Lithuanian Supercup (1): 2009

References

External links
 
 

1991 births
Living people
Lithuanian footballers
Lithuania international footballers
Association football midfielders
FK Sūduva Marijampolė players
RNK Split players
Chojniczanka Chojnice players
A Lyga players
Croatian Football League players
League of Ireland players
Dundalk F.C. players
Waterford F.C. players
I liga players
Lithuanian expatriate footballers
Lithuanian expatriate sportspeople in Croatia
Expatriate footballers in Croatia
Lithuanian expatriate sportspeople in Poland
Expatriate footballers in Poland
Lithuanian expatriate sportspeople in Ireland
Expatriate association footballers in the Republic of Ireland